Francisco Alberto Angulo Espinosa (born 19 June 1970) is a Spanish retired basketball player. He played as a shooting guard.

Born in Zaragoza, Angulo played mainly with local side CB Zaragoza, Real Madrid and Lleida. Also, he amassed a total of 98 caps for Spain. With the national team, he won the silver medal in the Eurobasket-99 in France and with Real Madrid he won the Spanish league once, in 2000.  He played for Spain at the 2000 Sydney Olympics. After retiring, he worked as a coach.

His younger brother Lucio was also a professional basketball player.

References

External links
ACB.com profile

1970 births
Living people
Baloncesto León players
Basket Zaragoza players
Basketball players at the 2000 Summer Olympics
CB Zaragoza players
Liga ACB players
Olympic basketball players of Spain
Real Madrid Baloncesto players
Shooting guards
Spanish men's basketball players
1998 FIBA World Championship players